The  is a botanical garden and arboretum located at 4589 To, Naka, Ibaraki, Japan. It is open daily except Mondays; an admission fee is charged.

The garden was established in 1981, and now contains a rose garden, aquatic plant garden, rock garden; collections of camellias, conifers, and tropical fruit trees; and a tropical greenhouse. All told, the garden contains about 70 bird species and 600 plant species, including 240 species of tropical plants, with approximately 360 types of trees in its arboretum.

See also 
 List of botanical gardens in Japan

References 
 Ibaraki Botanical Garden (Japanese)
 Jardins Botaniques Japonais article (French)

Arboreta in Japan
Botanical gardens in Japan
Gardens in Ibaraki Prefecture
Naka, Ibaraki